The 2006 Ms. Olympia contest 
is an IFBB professional bodybuilding competition and part of Joe Weider's Olympia Fitness & Performance Weekend 2006 was held on September 29, 2006, at the South Hall in the Las Vegas Convention Center in Winchester, Nevada and in the Orleans Arena at The Orleans Hotel and Casino in Paradise, Nevada. It was the 27th Ms. Olympia competition held. Other events at the exhibition include the Mr. Olympia, Fitness Olympia, and Figure Olympia contests.

Prizes
 1st $30,000
 2nd $18,000
 3rd $10,000
 4th $7,000
 5th $4,000
 6th $2,000
Total: $71,000

Results

Scorecard

Comparison to previous Olympia results:
 +1 - Iris Kyle
 +1 - Dayana Cadeau
 +10 - Annie Rivieccio
 +2 - Bonnie Priest
 +1 - Lisa Aukland
 +2 - Betty Pariso
 -6 - Yaxeni Oriquen-Garcia
 -4 - Gayle Moher
 -6 - Jitka Harazimova
 -5 - Tazzie Colomb
 -5 - Heather Foster
 -10 - Brenda Raganot

Attended
9th Ms. Olympia attended - Yaxeni Oriquen-Garcia
8th Ms. Olympia attended - Iris Kyle
7th Ms. Olympia attended - Dayana Cadeau
6th Ms. Olympia attended - Betty Pariso
5th Ms. Olympia attended - Gayle Moher and Brenda Raganot
4th Ms. Olympia attended - Jitka Harazimova
3rd Ms. Olympia attended - Tazzie Colomb and Bonnie Priest
2nd Ms. Olympia attended - Heather Foster, and Annie Rivieccio
1st Ms. Olympia attended - Helen Bouchard, Colette Nelson, and Dena Westerfield
Previous year Olympia attendees who did not attend - Mah-Ann Mendoza, Desiree Ellis, Rosemary Jennings, Marja Lehtonen, Antoinette Norman, Betty Viana-Adkins, and Tonia Williams

Notable Events
Iris Kyle reclaimed her throne this year after Yaxeni Oriquen-Garcia dethroned her of the Olympia title last year.
Valentina Chepiga qualified for the 2006 Ms. Olympia but did not attend.

2006 Ms. Olympia Qualified

See also
 2006 Mr. Olympia

References

2006 in bodybuilding
Ms. Olympia
Ms. Olympia
History of female bodybuilding
Ms. Olympia 2006